Gandalf (born Heinz Strobl, born 1952) is an Austrian new-age composer. He plays a wide variety of instruments, including guitar, keyboard, synthesizers and sitars. He includes electronic sounds in his music.

He released his first album Journey to an Imaginary Land on 17 March 1981, and his second, Visions, almost one year later on 16 March 1982. He has become one of Austria's most accomplished international musicians.

Discography

Studio albums
1981 - Journey to an Imaginary Land
1982 - Visions
1983 - To Another Horizon
1983 - More Than Just a Seagull
1984 - Magic Theatre
1985 - Tale from a Long Forgotten Kingdom
1987 - The Universal Play
1987 - From Source to Sea
1989 - Invisible Power
1990 - Labyrinth (Soundtrack)
1990 - Symphonic Landscapes
1992 - Gallery of Dreams (feat. Steve Hackett)
1992 - The Stones of Wisdom
1994 - To Our Children's Children
1994 - Colours of the Earth
1995 - Echoes from Ancient Dreams
1996 - The Shining (with Galadriel)
1996 - Gates to Secret Realities
1997 - Barakaya: Trees Water Life
1999 - Into the Light
1999 - Samsara
2000 - Visions 2001 (CD1: inspired by Tolkien, Lord of the Rings. CD2: a compilation "20 Years Gandalf: Rare & Precious Pieces") 
2002 - The Fountain of Secrets
2003 - Between Earth and Sky
2004 - Colors of a New Dawn
2005 - Der Prophet 
2006 - Sacred River
2007 - Lotus Land
2009 - Sanctuary
2011 - Earthsong and Stardance
2013 - Dreamweaver
2014 - The Prophet - Instrumental Edition (Music inspired by Kahlil Gibran) 
2014 - Frame By Frame
2016 - All is One - One is All
2020 - Secret Sarai
2023 - Eartheana

Compilations
1987 - Fantasia: Best of Gandalf
1991 - Reflection (Masterworks 1986-1990)
1995 - Magical Voyage 
1997 - Under Infinite Skies 
2000 - Reiki: Healing Light 
2001 - Visions: 2001 (CD1: inspired by Tolkien, Lord of the Rings. CD2: compilation, "20 Years Gandalf: Rare & Precious Pieces") 

Live albums
2008 - Live in Vienna 
2018 - 35 Years Live''

References

External links

Official Webpage for Gandalf

1952 births
Living people
New-age musicians
Austrian male composers
Austrian composers
Musicians from Vienna